Bover is a surname. Notable people with the surname include:

Joaquín María Bover de Roselló (1810-1865), Spanish writer and editor
Miguel Bover (1928–1966), Spanish road bicycle racer
Peter Bover (1772–1802), British Royal Navy officer
Ruben Bover (born 1992), Spanish footballer